Wallis Vitis (born 3 November 1995) is a French tennis player.

Vitis has a career high ITF combined juniors ranking of 340 achieved on 6 February 2012.

Vitis made her WTA main draw debut at the 2018 Internationaux de Strasbourg in the doubles draw partnering Joanna Tomera.

External links

1995 births
Living people
French female tennis players